Drummonderinoch is a place in Comrie, Perthshire, Scotland. Its modern name is Drummond Earnoch.
The origin of the name comes from the tragic episode of the Massacre of Monzievaird on October 21, 1490.

One of its sons, John Drummond, came to a grisly end in Lochearnhead; his severed head inspired Sir Walter Scott’s tale, "A Legend of Montrose".

References and notes

External links
Photos of Drummonderinoch and history on the Massacre at Monzievaird
More photos

Perth and Kinross